Wentworthville is a suburb in Sydney, in the state of New South Wales, Australia. Wentworthville is located 27 kilometres west of the Sydney central business district and is part of the Greater Western Sydney region. Wentworthville is split between the local government areas of the City of Parramatta and the Cumberland Council. Wentworthville is colloquially known as 'Wenty'.

History

Wentworthville, Wentworth Falls in the Blue Mountains and, Wentworth in far western New South Wales, were named after the Wentworth family. A land grant of 2000 acres (8 km2) in this area was made in 1810 to D'Arcy Wentworth, the father of William Wentworth, the famous Australian explorer, barrister, newspaper publisher, politician and landowner.

Another pioneer to the area, William Fullagar established the Star Inn on the corner of Ettalong Road and the Western Road (now the Great Western Highway). Fullagar also opened a cattle saleyards which became one of the principal ones for the colony. His family's estate "Essington House" is now the site of a Christian school. Fullagar Road is named after him.

In the mid-1800s, a land boom attracted people into the area, land was subdivided for housing and small farms. Wentworth's holdings were sub-divided – amounting to 600 lots. The railway line had been put through on its way to Penrith, in 1864, but it was not until 1883 that Wentworthville got its own public railway station. Originally the railway station was called T. R. Smith's Platform but was renamed Wentworthville two years later.

In 2007 the boundaries were redrawn and the northern part of Wentworthville became the suburb of Constitution Hill.

Heritage listings 
Wentworthville has a number of heritage-listed sites, including:
 Caloola Road: Mount Dorothy Reservoir

Commercial area
Wentworthville has two shopping precincts. The larger, older precinct sits on the Cumberland Council side of Wentworthville railway station (the other side of the railway is part of City of Parramatta Council local government area and is mainly zoned residential). A Supa IGA (formerly Franklins) dominated Wentworthville Mall Shopping Centre until late 2017 when it closed.

The newer commercial centre is on the Great Western Highway. It is dominated by Woolworths. Initially Woolworths operated in the main shopping precinct but new premises were obtained at their present location in the late 1980s. An Aldi sits on the other side of the Highway which is part of South Wentworthville.

For many years shopping tours were conducted to the Wentworthville area for the factory-outlets selling their products directly to the public. Bonds clothing factory in Dunmore Street sold direct to the public from their factory. Clothing factory closed.

Demographics
The most common ancestries in Wentworthville were Indian 26.0%, English 9.7%, Australian 9.4%, Chinese 7.1% and Lebanese 3.8%.

35.4% of people were born in Australia. The most common countries of birth were India 26.5%, Sri Lanka 7.8%, China 4.4%, Philippines 2.0% and Lebanon 1.7%. 30.1% of people only spoke English at home. Other languages spoken at home included Tamil 11.5%, Gujarati 7.9%, Hindi 7.2%, Punjabi 4.5% and Telugu 4.0%.

The most common responses for religion were Hinduism 34.9%, Catholic 18.9% and No Religion 11.6%.

Transport

Trains
Wentworthville railway station is on the North Shore & Western Line of the Sydney Trains network that connects west to Penrith and Richmond. After reaching the city, most trains continue north to North Sydney, Chatswood, Hornsby and Berowra. The trip to Sydney CBD typically takes 35 minutes.

The Wentworthville station was the site of the first major Tangara accident, a derailment, which occurred on 27 December 1989.

Buses
East of Old Prospect Road, the Liverpool-Parramatta T-way runs along the southern boundary. The North-West T-way runs just outside the suburb boundaries on Mons Road.

Transit Systems Sydney runs route 818 from Westmead Hospital to Merrylands via Wentworthville railway station.

Hillsbus runs the following routes
700 from Blacktown to Parramatta via Wentworthville – running along the southern border of the suburb
705 also running from Blacktown to Parramatta but via Wentworthville railway station.
711 runs from the non shop side of Wentworthville station, from Blacktown to Parramatta
708 from Parramatta to Constitution Hill via Wentworthville railway station.

Roads
The M4 Western Motorway and the parallel Great Western Highway run east–west through the southern side. The Cumberland Highway runs through the western side of Wentworthville on its way south (from Hornsby via the Pennant Hills Road to Liverpool).

Schools
Wentworthville Public School
Our Lady of Mt Carmel Primary School
Darcy Road Public School
Westmead Christian Grammar School (previously Essington Christian Academy)

Sport
Wentworthville is home to local rugby league team the Wentworthville Magpies (feeder club for Parramatta Eels), who play in the Jim Beam Cup and the NSW Cup (winning the 2008 NSW Cup), though the nearest NRL team is the nearby Parramatta Eels.

Other facilities
 Library – as part of the Cumberland Council library service.
 Swimming – Wentworthville Swimming Pool operates near the railway station.

References

External links
 

Suburbs of Sydney
Populated places established in 1810
Cumberland Council, New South Wales
City of Parramatta